= Leader of Hong Kong =

Leader of Hong Kong may refer to:

- Governor of Hong Kong
- Chief Executive of Hong Kong
